Kal Dasht-e Abu Talebi (also Romanized as Kāl Dasht-e Ābū Tālebī; also known as Kāl Dasht-e Bālā and Kalā Dasht) is a village in Tarrud Rural District, in the Central District of Damavand County, Tehran Province, Iran. At the 2006 census, the population was 737, in 206 families.

References 

Populated places in Damavand County